The coat of arms of Chile dates from 1834 and was designed by the English artist Charles Wood Taylor (1792–1856). It is made up by a figurative background divided in two equal parts: the top one is blue and the bottom, red. A five pointed white star is in the centre of the shield. This background is supported in one side by a condor, the most significant bird of prey from the Andes, and in the other, by a huemul, a mammal endemic to Chile. Both animals wear golden naval crowns symbolising the heroic deeds of the Chilean Navy in the Pacific Ocean.

The coat of arms is crowned by a three-feathered crest, each feather bearing one colour: blue, white and red. This crest was a symbol of distinction that former presidents of the Republic used to wear on their hats.

Underneath the coat of arms and on the elaborated pedestal, there is a white band with the motto: Por la Razón o la Fuerza ("By reason or force").

This emblem is the last of a series of variations due to diverse circumstances and understandings.

History

The first coat of arms 

The first coat of arms was created during the office of President José Miguel Carrera, in 1812. It was designed over an oval in which center was depicted a column representing the Tree of Freedom. On top of this column was a terrestrial globe; over the globe, a lance and a palm leaf crossed and over these two, a star.

Standing, on both sides of the fixture, was the figure of an indigenous woman and a man. On top of everything was written, in Latin, Post Tenebras Lux ("After the Darkness, Light") and at the bottom, Aut Consilio Aut Ense ("By Council or by Sword").

This emblem, like the first Chilean flag, was initially exclusively for army use. In Chile, the Spanish emblems were still used at the time of the Chilean War of Independence. When the Spanish army arrived in Chile in 1813, with the goal of reconquering the country, the first independent emblems were adopted as national symbols.

There are no original representations of this first coat of arms, so its design is open to interpretation. One of the few sources is a description made in the Memoria histórica sobre la Revolución de Chile by Melchor Martínez. Although the version with supporters is the most accepted representation of the coat, other historians have suggested that the coat of arms was oval-shaped, and had also a reverse depicting a sun rising behind mountain with the mottoes Aurora libertatis chilensis ("The beginning of Chilean liberty") and Umbra et nocti, lux et libertas succedunt ("Shadow and night are succeeded by light and liberty").

In 1817, two new coats of arms emerged. The first one, created in June, showed a similar pillar and globe, and the motto Libertad ("Liberty") over them, together with the words Unión y fuerza ("Union and strength") on a black blue field.

Transitory coat of arms 

Two years later, on 23 September 1819, a new project for a coat of arms was approved in the Senate. It was a dark blue field, with a column standing on a white marble pedestal in the middle. On top of this column, the new American world with the word "Libertad" (Liberty) over it. Above this sign, a five-pointed star, representing the Province of Santiago. Two similar stars, representing Concepción and Coquimbo, were at each side of the column.

This combination of elements was surrounded by two small branches of laurel with their buds tied with a tricolor ribbon. Around this ribbon, the whole armory of the country was depicted in strict order: cavalry, infantry, dragoons, artillery and bombardiers.

To complete the coat of arms, an indigenous man held it with his hands over his head, while sitting on an American cayman with one foot resting on the Horn of Plenty. The cayman had, in its jaws, the Lion of Castile, whose crown laid fallen on one side and was holding the ripped Spanish flag with its front paws.

This coat of arms was used until 1834, when it was replace with another one very similar to the current one.

The current coat of arms 

In 1832, Joaquín Prieto commissioned the creation of a permanent coat of arms for the Republic. Charles Chatworthy Wood Taylor, an English artist, was designer of the coat that included a field party per fess, blue and red, with a condor and a huemul for supporters and three feathers with the national colors of Chile, that symbolized the feathers that the President and Supreme Director used on their hats as a symbol of power.

In 1920, the motto Por la razón o la fuerza was added to the coat of arms.

Evolution

As part of the Spanish Empire

As an independent nation

References

External links 

Sobre los verdaderos simbolos patrios de Chile simbolospatrios.cl
Gallery of Chilean coats of arms

Chile
National symbols of Chile
Chile
Chile
Chile
Chile
Chilean coats of arms
1834 in Chile
Chile